Princess Ashi Dechen Yangzom Wangchuck (born 2 December 1981) is the daughter of the fourth King of Bhutan Jigme Singye Wangchuck and his wife, Queen Mother Ashi Tshering Yangdon Wangchuck. She is the sister of the fifth King, Jigme Khesar Namgyel Wangchuck.

Royal duties 
Princess Dechen Yangzom has been based in Mongar since 2006 as His Majesty's Representatives for people's welfare. She has travelled across the country in order to ensure the effective delivery of kidu to the most deserving sections of society.

Family 
She married Dasho Tandin Namgyel at the Dechencholing palace on 29 October 2009. He is a son of Dasho Kipchu Dorji (sometime Auditor General of the Kingdom of Bhutan), and his wife, Aum Chimi Wangmo.

They have one daughter and two sons:

Ashi Dechen Yuidem Yangzom Wangchuck.
Dasho Ugyen Dorji Wangchuck. 
Dasho Jigme Singye Wangchuck.

Titles and styles 

 2 December 1981 – present: Her Royal Highness Princess Ashi Dechen Yangzom Wangchuck.

See also 
 House of Wangchuck
 Line of succession to the Bhutanese throne

References 

|-

1981 births
Living people
Bhutanese monarchy